Kolijan Restaq-e Olya Rural District is a rural district (dehestan) in Kolijan Rostaq District, Sari County, Mazandaran Province, Iran. At the 2006 census, its population was 9,543, in 2,643 families. The rural district has 27 villages.

References 

Rural Districts of Mazandaran Province
Sari County